Raglan Footpath was a station on the former Coleford, Monmouth, Usk and Pontypool Railway. It was opened in October 1857 with the rest of the line and located 6 miles and 43 chains from Monmouth Troy. It was intended to serve the village of Raglan, Monmouthshire. It was closed in 1876 along with Raglan Road and replaced by a single station simply called 'Raglan'. The station had a small station house.

References

Disused railway stations in Monmouthshire
Former Great Western Railway stations
Railway stations in Great Britain opened in 1857
Railway stations in Great Britain closed in 1876
1857 establishments in Wales